Katsuhiko Nakamizo (born 5 March 1966) is a Japanese rower. He competed in the men's lightweight coxless four event at the 1996 Summer Olympics.

References

1966 births
Living people
Japanese male rowers
Olympic rowers of Japan
Rowers at the 1996 Summer Olympics
Sportspeople from Gunma Prefecture
Asian Games medalists in rowing
Rowers at the 1994 Asian Games
Asian Games silver medalists for Japan
Medalists at the 1994 Asian Games
20th-century Japanese people